Protestant Christian churches in Mongolia are Lutheran, Presbyterians, Seventh-day Adventists and various evangelical Protestant groups. The Mongolian Evangelical Alliance estimates there are 35,000 Protestant Christians in Mongolia.

Protestant Christian teaching did not reach Mongolia until the mid-19th century, brought by missionaries such as James Gilmour. The rise of a communist government in the 1920s meant an end of the Protestant Christian missions. However, since the end of communism in 1990, Protestant missionaries have become active again.

The country has a local Christian TV station, Eagle TV, and a pro-Christian radio station, Family Radio.

The Seventh-day Adventist Church in 2008 had around 1,200 members and a language school in Ulaanbaatar. The first Adventists came from efforts by American missionaries starting in 1991. As of the 2015 yearbook, the Mongolia Mission has 5 churches and 2107 members

References